Georg-Hermann Greiner (2 January 1920 – 26 September 2014) was a Luftwaffe night fighter ace who served during World War II. Greiner was recipient of the Knight's Cross of the Iron Cross with Oak Leaves—the fourth highest German award by war's end. He was also a squadron commander in the prestigious Nachtjagdgeschwader 1 (NJG 1—Night Fighter Wing 1), the most successful night fighter interceptor unit of any nation in the history of aerial warfare.

Greiner primarily engaged British RAF Bomber Command crews in their bombing campaigns over German-occupied Europe and was credited with 51 aerial victories over Allied aircraft: four United States Army Air Force (USAAF) bombers during daylight hours and 47 Royal Air Force (RAF) aircraft at night. Only 23 other night fighter pilots—all German World War II serviceman—surpassed Greiner's total which was achieved in three years and six months of operations.

Following the conclusion of the War, Greiner and close friend Heinz-Wolfgang Schnaufer were arrested illegally crossing the German-Swiss border attempting an escape to Argentina. Both Greiner and Schnaufer were detained in an Allied prisoner of war camp and released in 1947. Greiner went on to study law and returned to service in the German Air Force in 1957, retiring with the rank of Oberstleutnant in 1972.

Early life and career
Hermann Greiner was born on 3 January 1920 in the small Bavarian town of Heidenheim, Middle Franconia. Hermann was the third child of Albrecht and Sophie Greiner. His father moved away to Bochum, located in the German Ruhr to seek work with Reichsbank, Weimar Germany's central bank. Bochum was under the occupation of the French Army after World War I and there was a distinct lack of affordable housing. The family could not follow and the young Hermann Greiner rarely saw his father during his early childhood. When Albrecht had saved sufficient funds he was able to buy a flat in Bochum and he sent for his family. Greiner's father was a strict disciplinarian and the friction caused disharmony in the family. Greiner developed a strong desire to succeed in everything and prove himself worthy of his father's time.

Greiner joined the German Gymnasts Association (Deutscher Turner Bund) at seven and three years later the German Scout Movement (Deutscher Pfadfinder Bund). In 1933 he travelled to Switzerland and Italy with the scout movement at 13. Greiner had the opportunity to stay in Milan and Rome with German families. Greiner was unusually well travelled for a person of his age and social status at that time. In 1936 he was invited to participate at the International Youth Camp for the 1936 Summer Olympics in Berlin. Greiner received invitations to Hungary in 1937, Bulgaria in 1938 and Canada in 1939, but could only visit the Hungarian capital Budapest.

A consequence of the National Socialist rise to power in 1933 was Greiner's enforced membership in the Hitler Youth (Hitlerjugend). After four years in the organisation Greiner took an interest in aviation and joined the Flying Hitler Youth (Flieger Hitlerjugend), which was absorbed into the German Air Sports Association (Deutscher Luftsportscharen), in 1937. Here, Greiner passed the aptitude tests for a career as an officer in the Luftwaffe. All aspiring officers had to complete the Abitur. On 5 April 1938 he achieved the Abitur and then undertook six months of compulsory Reich Labour Service (Reichsarbeitsdienst).

Luftwaffe
On 8 November 1938 he underwent basic training at the Second Pilot Replacement Unit at Detmold in Westphalia. He completed the course on 20 March 1939. At the conclusion of the course Greiner was rewarded with an acceptance as a Fahnenjunker (officer cadet). He was posted to the Luftkriegsschule 2 (LKS 2—2nd air war school) at Berlin-Gatow to begin flying lessons. There, he learned the rudiments of flying. Greiner flew the Focke-Wulf Fw 44, the Bücker Bü 131 and the Arado Ar 96. On 30 October 1939 he was granted his licence and pilot's badge, and A/B flying certificate, in recognition of his elementary training and qualification on advanced single-engine training aircraft.

Greiner moved to Saxony where he attended the Flugzeugführerschule C (Aircraft Advanced School C—advanced flying school) in Lönnewitz. At the school Greiner learned to fly the Heinkel He 111 and Junkers Ju 86. At this school he flew the Messerschmitt Bf 110 for the first time. Greiner attended the Long-Range reconnaissance school at Großenhain, followed by the Blindflugschule (Blind Flying School) at Neuburg an der Donau. From here Greiner was posted to the Zerstörerschule (Destroyer School) at Memmingen. Greiner then moved to the Jagdfliegerschule (Fighter School) at Schleißheim, near Munich. Finally, he completed his course at the Nachtjadgschule (Night Fighter School) at Stuttgart to learn the art of night fighting. Greiner flight training ended in September 1941.

World War II

World War II in Europe began on Friday, 1 September 1939, when German forces invaded Poland. Following the 1939 aerial Battle of the Heligoland Bight, Royal Air Force (RAF) attacks shifted to the cover of darkness, initiating the Defence of the Reich campaign. By mid-1940, Generalmajor (Brigadier General) Josef Kammhuber had established a night air defense system dubbed the Kammhuber Line. It consisted of a series of control sectors equipped with radars and searchlights and an associated night fighter. Each sector named a Himmelbett (canopy bed) would direct the night fighter into visual range with target bombers. In 1941, the Luftwaffe started equipping night fighters with airborne radar such as the Lichtenstein radar. This airborne radar did not come into general use until early 1942.

Night fighter career
On 1 October 1941, Leutnant Greiner reported for duty with Nachtjagdgeschwader 1 (NJG 1—Night Fighter Wing 1) at Stade near Hamburg. Greiner was assigned to II. Gruppe (Group) under the command of Gruppenkommandeur (Group Commander) Walter Ehle. Greiner was transferred to 4 staffel in mid-January 1942. Along with 6 staffel it formed the nucleus of II./NJG 1, based at Leeuwarden, Netherlands. In February Greiner participated in Operation Donnerkeil (Thunderbolt), an air superiority mission to provide cover to the German Kriegsmarine (War Navy) and three major warships traversing the English Channel to bases in Germany. The battleships Scharnhorst and Gneisenau and the cruiser Prinz Eugen began the risky operation on 11 February. The naval component was called Operation Cerberus, and succeeded.

On 20 April 1942 Greiner was promoted to Oberleutnant (First Lieutenant). In 1942 RAF Bomber Command, under the command of Air Officer Commanding, Arthur Harris, embarked on its long campaign of area bombing against German industrial cities and military targets. On the night of the 25/26 June 1942, 960 aircraft attacked Bremen, targeting the city, shipyards and the Focke-Wulf factory. 472 Vickers Wellington, 124 Handley-Page Halifax, 96 Avro Lancaster, 69 Short Stirling, 51 Bristol Blenheim, 50 Handley-Page Hampden, 50 Armstrong Whitworth Whitley, 24 Boston, 20 Avro Manchester and four de Havilland Mosquito bombers were used. A further 102 Lockheed Hudson and Wellington bombers of RAF Coastal Command were sent on the operation. Greiner was able to intercept a Wellington at daybreak, claiming it shot down south of Harlingen for his first victory at 06:00 with Bordfunker Rolf Kissing. On 6 October 1942, Greiner shot down his second victim west of Harlingen at 23:24. The bomber, a No. 103 Squadron RAF Halifax II, W1189, PM-E, crashed killing all the crew: Sergeants J. Porter, P. B. J. Butcher, R Carson, Pilot Officers R. Whitelock, A. G. Richards, B. C. H. King and Flight Sergeant B. J. Hardesty (RCAF seconded).

Greiner was ordered to report to the Nachtjagdschule at Echterdingen as an instructor. Greiner did not want to serve in a teaching role but as a pilot with only two victories in a year of operations, he had little choice. His Staffelkapitän (squadron leader) Hauptmann (Captain) Helmut Lent promised him a return to the Gruppe after six months. Greiner's stint as instructor began on 23 November 1942. He looked for an opportunity to fly on patrol but the school did not have the required technical equipment. One night in early March 1943, Greiner took off and claimed a Short Stirling shot down near Rastatt. The date and location were not recorded but it was officially granted as his third victory.

On 18 May 1943 Greiner returned to II./NJG 1 which from the 1 October 1942 had been re-designated IV./NJG 1. In March the British applied their area bombing and bomber stream tactics to the Ruhr. The Bomber Command attacks, which lasted until July 1943, were dubbed the Battle of the Ruhr. On the night of the 25/26 May Greiner claimed two Lancaster bombers that were part of a force attacking Düsseldorf. The first was accounted for west of Den Helder at 03:05 and the second north of Bergen aan Zee at 03:25 over North Holland. The claims were for Greiner's fourth and fifth victories which qualified him as a night fighter ace. One of the bombers was Lancaster I ED695, P-OJ, from No. 467 Squadron RAF. Flying Officer R. S. Giddey, Sergeant S. G. Keirs, W. V. Morris, R. V. Avaan, A.F Birkbeck, Pilot Officers K. R. Langhorne and P. R. Collins were reported missing in action. It transpired Langhorne and Birkbeck has been killed in action, the remainder of the crew were taken prisoner of war. On 1 June 1943 Greiner was awarded the Iron Cross 2nd Class.

Greiner achieved the last of his successes in the Ruhr campaign the following month. On the night of the 5/6 July 1943, he intercepted a Short Stirling on a "Gardening" sortie. Northwest of Leeuwarden he claimed the only night victory of the Luftwaffe at 02:31. The bomber was Short Stirling III, EF436, AA-A, of No. 75 Squadron RNZAF. Sergeant William Edward Stobbs was killed with his crew. Greiner's last victory in the Ruhr campaign came on the 25 July 1943. This night Harris began Operation Gomorrha, a massed air attack on Hamburg. At 02:50 southwest of Den Helder, Greiner claimed a Halifax. This was most likely Lancaster I, ED878, PM-V, of No. 103 Squadron RAF. Warrant Officer F. F. O'Hanlon was killed with his crew when the bomber crashed west of the Frisian Islands.

On the night of the 3/4 August 1943 Greiner claimed his ninth and tenth aerial victories northwest of Schiermonnikoog at 03:06 and 03:48 The first was claimed as a Lancaster, the second as a Wellington. On 24 August Bomber Command mounted an attack on Berlin for the first time using ground-mapping radar. Greiner shot down a Halifax at 01:43 northwest of Berlin. He recorded his 12th victory over a Lancaster near Bergfeine at 23:48 on 22 September. The following night he claimed a Lancaster south of Lampertheim at 23:30. On the night of the 27 September 1943 Greiner intercepted a Halifax over the North Sea. As Greiner approached he saw the bomber was heavily damaged and flying on only two engines just above the waves. Greiner was amazed at the skill of the crew for flying this far. Greiner considered the condition of the bomber and crew, then rocked his wings in salute and flew back to base.

Staffelkapitän
On 4 October 1943 Hermann Greiner was appointed Staffelkapitän of 10./NJG 1. At this time Greiner's Bf 110G-4 was fitted with Schräge Musik, upward firing armament. The arrangement allowed for German night fighters to approach the British bombers in their blind spot, from underneath. The British four-engine bombers lacked a ball turret and the German crew could take their time in aiming more carefully. The night fighter usually flew to the side of the bomber to avoid it being seen by the tail gunner and then slid underneath. The risk in the conventional tactic of approaching from behind and passing within view of the tail turret was eliminated. Greiner was to shoot down the majority of his remaining victims using the Schräge Musik.

Greiner had to wait until Bomber Command flew against Braunschweig on 14/15 January 1944 to use the new armament system. This night the German fighters infiltrated the bomber stream as it crossed the frontier and commenced their attack on the bombers near Bremen. The early interception ensured 11 aircraft were shot down—all Pathfinders. The loss of so many pathfinders prevented the bombers from accurate bombing the city and little damage was done. Near Saint-Dizier at 20:00 intercepted a Lancaster and shot it down.
The United States Army Air Force (USAAF) daylight raids were also resisted by the Nachtjagd. On 30 January 1944, Greiner intercepted a B-17 Flying Fortress near Osnabrück. At 13:00 he claimed it shot down. Greiner followed this up with another at the same location at 12:25 on 10 February. It was the only claim filed by a night fighter pilot on this date. Greiner's 17th claim came on 25 February when he claimed a Lancaster over Saint-Dizier at 22:59. Greiner recorded the location as "Beacon Leopold".

Greiner achieved another daylight victory on 6 March 1944. By this time the P-51 Mustang and P-47 Thunderbolt with long-range drop-tanks appeared and it quickly became apparent the zestörer and night fighters could not be committed to day operations without sustaining heavy losses. Greiner's Geschwader was committed to battle nonetheless. The United States Eighth Air Force (US8AF) operated against Berlin on 6 March. Greiner was not scrambled but undertook a flight test to ready his Bf 110G for action. As he took off he observed a B-17 fly over the aerodrome at low-level and gave chase. As he closed he noticed no obvious signs of damage. The B-17 pilot did not alter course or speed. Greiner stayed out of range of the bomber's 13 M2 Browning machine guns and fired. The aircraft—B-17 42-38118 from the 91st Bomb Group—crash-landed. Pilot Second Lieutenant Ben Fourmay was captured but two of his crew were killed. At 13:53 the same day, Greiner accounted for a Consolidated B-24 Liberator over Münsterbrück. Greiner's two day victories were two of the six claims submitted by night fighter crews—four others were credited with a single victory one of which was from Greiner's Geschwader. Eight of the B-24's ten-man crew survived. The bomber, B-24H 42-52306 of 458th Bombardment Group, USAAF flown by Second Lieutenant J. McManus, crash-landed at Münsterlager an Ueltzen. The daylight operation cost the Americans 69 bombers and 11 fighters. The Luftwaffe lost 64 fighters with eight crew killed and 36 missing.

On 19 March 1944 Hermann Greiner was awarded the German Cross in Gold for 15 night and four day victories. Greiner was transferred to command 11./NJG 1 on 15 April 1944. In April 1944, IV/.NJG 1 moved to Sint-Truiden—Saint-Trond in the French pronunciation—Belgium. The Gruppe was now under the command of Heinz-Wolfgang Schnaufer. He achieved his first success with 11 staffel on the night of the 22/23 April 1944 Greiner scrambled for a night patrol when Bomber Command struck Düsseldorf. The 596 bombers (323 Lancaster and 254 Halifax) were supported by 19 Mosquito intruders. Northwest of the city, Greiner was vectored onto a Lancaster and claimed it shot down at 01:39. The bomber was Greiner's 20th victory. On 24/25 April Greiner claimed a Halifax near Breda at 02:18. On the night of the 27/28 April Greiner achieved another double victory. This night 322 Lancaster bombers of 1, 3, 6 and 8 Groups bombed Friedrichshafen. Another 223 aircraft (191 Halifax, 16 Lancaster and 16 Mosquito bombers) were despatched to Aulnoye-Aymeries. A third wave of 120 Halifax, 16 Lancaster and eight Mosquito bombers attacked railway yards at Montzen on the Belgian-German border. Greiner intercepted the bomber stream over Belgium. West of Genk at 01:58 he claimed a Lancaster then a Halifax southeast of Oerle two minutes later. The only Lancaster lost this night was JA976, from No. 405 Squadron RCAF. It crashed at Diest. Squadron leader E. W. Blenkinsop DFC, Croix de Guerre, evaded capture and joined with the Belgian Resistance before being captured in December 1944. He died at Neuengamme concentration camp on 23 January 1945. Blenkinsop was certainly Greiner's 23rd victory.

Normandy
The Western Allies began a policy of increasing attacks on the Belgian and French rail and communication networks in preparation for Overlord, and the D-Day landings. On 1/2 May 1944 131 Lancaster and eight Mosquito bombers belonging to No. 5 Group attacked the aircraft assembly and an explosives factories in Toulouse. Another 137 aircraft (89 Halifax, 40 Lancaster, 8 Mosquito bombers) from 6 and 8 Groups attacked the railway yards at Saint Ghislain. A follow up raid 132 aircraft (110 Halifax, 14 Lancaster, 8 Mosquito bombers) of No. 4 and 8 Groups attacked railway targets at Malines. Chambly was also struck by 120 aircraft (96 Lancaster, 16 Stirling, 8 Mosquito bombers) of No. 3 and 8 Groups. 75 Lancasters of No. 1 Group attacked Berliet and Lyon. A further 46 Lancaster and four Mosquitos of No. 5 Group carried out an accurate attack on aircraft-repair workshops at Tours. 28 Mosquitos operated over Ludwigshafen and Achères, while another 34 intruder patrols were flown. 32 Halifax and three Stirlings took part of "Gardening" operations off the French coast and Frisian Islands. 40 aircraft flew supplies to the French Resistance also. Greiner was scrambled to intercept the stream heading to Saint Ghislain. At 00:15 south of Brussels Greiner claimed a Halifax. Flying west, Greiner attacked another northwest of Oudenaarde at 00:30. The last of the two inflated his tally to 25. On 9 May, and successive nights over the 12–13 May, and again on 25 May, Greiner claimed single victories against two Halifax and two Lancaster bombers. Greiner claimed his last victories of the month on 27/28 May. Bomber Command committed 331 heavy bombers against Leopoldsburg. At 02:29 and 02:48, Greiner claimed two Lancaster bombers, to bring his total to 31 bombers destroyed. The location of the engagements are recorded as Antwerp. The last was probably a Lancaster of No. 640 Squadron RAF piloted by Flying Officer F. Williams DFM, who was killed with two other crewmembers. The month of May was Greiner's most successful of the war.

On 1 June 1944 Greiner was promoted to Hauptmann. Five days later, Operation Overlord began with the Allied invasion of Normandy. 11./NJG 1, stayed in Sint-Truiden but extended its area of operations deep into France. Bomber Command sent out 225 Lancaster and 86 Halifax bombers to France supported by 18 Mosquitos on 15/16 June 1944. The No. 1, 3, 4 and 8 Groups attacked railway targets at Evreux, Gare de Massy – Palaiseau, Nantes and Tours. Near Paris at 01:26, Greiner claimed a Halifax for victory 32. On 15/16 June 1944, 227 aircraft (119 Lancaster, 99 Halifax and nine 9 Mosquito) from 4, 5 and 8 Groups attacked an ammunition dumps at Thorigné-Fouillard and a fuel dump at Châtellerault. The 5 Group raid at Châtellerault destroyed 8 fuel sites out of 35 in the target area without loss. 224 aircraft (184 Lancaster, 30 Stirling, 10 Mosquito bombers) of 3 and 8 Groups attacked railway yards at Lens and Valenciennes. Six Lancasters were lost from the Lens raid and five Lancasters from Valenciennes attack. 31 Mosquitos bombed to Gelsenkirchen, and 34 intruder patrols were carried out. Another seven Stirling and four Halifax bombers flew "Gardening" sorties minelaying off Channel ports. One Mosquito was lost from the Gelsenkirchen raid. Greiner attacked a Lancaster from an unknown bomber stream northeast of Lille at 00:56. On 5/6 July he claimed the second to last victory of the night over Dieppe at 02:05. On 20/21 July he claimed a victory in Grid LN-KN and KL at 01:28 and 01:37 for his 35th and 36th victories. On 27 July 1944 Hermann Greiner was awarded the Knight's Cross of the Iron Cross and the presentation was made by Generalleutnant Joseph Schmid.

Defence of the Reich
The German front in France and Belgium collapsed in August–September 1944 and NJG 1 was evacuated back to Germany and based at Dortmund on 2 September 1944. Greiner achieved his last victory at Sint Truiden on 12 August 1944. Bomber Command bombed Brunswick with 242 Lancasters and 137 Halifaxes. 17 Lancasters and 10 Halifaxes were lost ( 7.1 per cent). 297 aircraft including 191 Lancasters, 96 Halifaxes and 10 Mosquitos attacked Rüsselsheim am Main. 13 Lancasters and seven Halifaxes were lost (6.7 per cent). The target for this raid was the Opel motor factory. Greiner intercepted a Lancaster west of Frankfurt and shot down his 37th bomber.

Soon after this mission Greiner was called into action again. On 12/13 September 1944, Greiner was ordered to intercept a 378-bomber raid heading for Frankfurt. That night he flew with his experienced radar operator Oberfeldwebel Rolf Kissing and a new, 18-year old gunner, Greiner was attacked by a de Havilland Mosquito night fighter. The first burst of fire hit Kissing in the head and the inexperienced gunner froze. The port engine was also shattered. The Mosquito did not attack again and out of consideration for Kissing, Greiner did not order a bale out or attempt a forced-landing. Instead he made a wheels-up landing at Düsseldorf airfield using compressed air to lower the landing-gear. Kissing died the same night. Greiner held his funeral oration with difficulty. Greiner's attacker is unknown. Flight Lieutenant R. D. Doleman and D. C. Bunch from No. 157 Squadron RAF plus Flight Lieutenant W. W. Provan and his radar operator, Warrant Officer Nicol from No. 29 Squadron RAF were the only No. 100 Group RAF Mosquito crews to file claims against Bf 110s in the Frankfurt area. Two other claims were filed for German aircraft shot down over southern Germany.

Greiner recovered from the death of Kissing and returned to operations within days. On 19–20 September 1944 Bomber Command struck Mönchengladbach with 227 Lancaster bombers and 10 Mosquitos from 1 and 5 Groups Greiner infiltrated the bomber stream west southwest of the city and at 22:55 and 23:02 claimed a Lancaster destroyed. On the 23/24 September 1944 Bomber Command attacked the Dortmund–Ems Canal with several hundred bombers. West southwest of Münster Greiner claimed a Lancaster bomber at 23:16 for his 40th victory.

Group commander
On 1 November, Greiner was appointed Gruppenkommandeur (group commander) of IV./NJG 1. He succeeded Major Heinz-Wolfgang Schnaufer in this capacity. On 4/5 November 1944 Greiner achieved two more successes against Lancasters at 19:21 and 19:35 west of Essen. Greiner's 42nd victory was his last in 1944.

On 5/6 January 1945 Greiner had his most successful patrol. Bomber Command attacked Hannover with 340 Halifax and 310 Lancaster bombers supported by 14 Mosquitos. 23 Halifax and eight Lancaster bombers were lost. Greiner claimed three Lancaster bombers in rapid succession over Hannover at 19:12, 19:15, 19:18. Greiner shot down his fourth of the night at 19:22. The claim was his 46th victory of the war. One of the bombers was Halifax LV952, MH-F, of No. 51 Squadron RAF. Only the gunner, Sergeant Don Thomsett, survived. He met Hermann Greiner in May 1998. On 21/22 February Greiner shot down two Halifax bombers near Neuss at 23:31 and 23:40.

On 3 March 1945 No. 4 Group RAF was ordered to destroy the synthetic oil plant at Kamen while 5 Group would attempt to eliminate the aqueduct, safety gates, and canal boats on the Dortmund–Ems Canal at Ladbergen. Nearly 5,000 RAF airmen prepared to take part in 817 heavy bombers which were fueled and armed in the evening. The Luftwaffe planned a counter-attack this night. Named Operation Gisela, a large wave of night fighters were detailed to return with the bomber stream to their bases in England and attack them. Greiner was not scheduled to take part in the operation. His unit was ordered to engagement the incoming bomber stream. Near Dortmund at 21:57, 22:08 and 22:12 he claimed a Lancaster bomber. This brought his final tally to 51 Allied bombers destroyed—47 RAF and four USAAF. These interceptions were his last of the war.

In April 1945 he was ordered to intercept a Bomber Command attack on Dessau but became disorientated. The radio ceased working and the crew were lost. Fearing they were drifting eastwards towards Soviet lines, the crew sought to find a landmark without success. Greiner was low on fuel, he pointed the nose of the Bf 110 due west and flew for as long as possible until the tanks were exhausted.  After bailing out Greiner's parachute became entangled on the night fighter for a brief time until it tore a strip away, freeing him and allowing Greiner to deploy the ripcord. Greiner was wounded when he landed but swiftly returned to his unit. On 17 April 1945 Greiner became the 840th serviceman of the Wehrmacht to receive the Knight's Cross of the Iron Cross with Oak Leaves. He also received the Night Fighter Clasp in Gold for flying over 200 missions on 20 April 1945. After the surrender he was imprisoned by the British.

Later life
Greiner was held as a prisoner of war. In the autumn, 1945, he was transferred to a prisoner of war camp run by the United States Army, near Frankfurt. Greiner was discharged and returned to his mother's home near Stuttgart. Months of inactivity Greiner yearned to fly again. He met with Heinz-Wolfgang Schnaufer to discuss the possibility of becoming a civil pilot and starting an aviation business. There was no opportunities in Europe or the United States. The two men decided to travel to South America to seek employment. The nearest consulates were in Bern, Switzerland. Greiner moved to the border town of Offenbach, across the frontier from Basle. After the arrangements with the embassies in Bern were made, they crossed the border on 23 September 1946. Schnaufer could not be away from his family's wine business for too long and suggested crossing the border illegally. The negotiations failed and the two were caught on their return. The Swiss handed Greiner and Schnaufer over to the French Army and imprisoned for six months without charge in Lörrach.

Greiner moved to Bonn and studied law. After marrying in 1949 he gave up his studies for financial reasons and became a sales representative for a textiles firm. In 1956 the Federal Republic of Germany was remilitarised and the Bundeswehr (German Armed Forces) was founded.  Greiner joined the Bundesluftwaffe as Hauptmann in August 1957. Over the next 15 years he served at the Pilot's School at Landsberg, rising to the rank of Oberstleutnant (Lieutenant Colonel). Greiner retired in 1972.

Summary of career

Aerial victory claims
Foreman, Parry and Mathews, authors of Luftwaffe Night Fighter Claims 1939 – 1945, researched the German Federal Archives and found records for 51 nocturnal victory claims Mathews and Foreman also published Luftwaffe Aces — Biographies and Victory Claims, listing Vinke with 48 claims, including four four-engined bombers by day, plus two further unconfirmed claims.

Victory claims were logged to a map-reference (PQ = Planquadrat), for example "PQ 05 Ost LN-KN". These sectors were then subdivided into 36 smaller units to give a location area 3 × 4 km in size.

Awards
 Iron Cross (1939)
 2nd Class (26 June 1942)
 1st Class (1 June 1943)
 Front Flying Clasp of the Luftwaffe
 in Bronze on 1 October 1942
 in Silver on 4 September 1943
 in Gold on 15 February 1944
 Honour Goblet of the Luftwaffe (Ehrenpokal der Luftwaffe) on 26 December 1943
 German Cross in Gold on 29 March 1944 as Oberleutnant in the 10./NJG 1
 Knight's Cross of the Iron Cross with Oak Leaves
 Knight's Cross on 27 July 1944 as Oberleutnant and Staffelkapitän of the 11./NJG 1
 840th Oak Leaves on 17 April 1945 as Hauptmann and Gruppenkommandeur of the IV./NJG 1

Notes

References

Citations

Bibliography

 
 
 
 
 
 
 
 
 
 
 
 
 
 
 
 
 
 

1920 births
2014 deaths
People from Weißenburg-Gunzenhausen
Luftwaffe pilots
German World War II flying aces
German Air Force personnel
Recipients of the Gold German Cross
Recipients of the Knight's Cross of the Iron Cross with Oak Leaves
Reich Labour Service members
Hitler Youth members
Military personnel from Bavaria